The Brothers is a BBC Radio 4 sitcom about two brothers who gave up their careers in order to start a website design company.  It aired from May 2004-March 2007.  There were sixteen half-hour episodes over three series.  It starred Adam Godley, Raymond Coulthard, Pauline McLynn and Pearce Quigley and was written by Caroline and David Stafford.

Notes and references
Lavalie, John. "The Brothers" EpGuides. 21 Jul 2005. 29 Jul 2005

References

BBC Radio 4 programmes